Al-Mutawakkil I, (died 9 January 1406) was the seventh Abbasid caliph of Cairo for the Mamluk Sultanate between 1362 and 1383, and then 1389 and 1406.

Life 

During his reign Khallas Mansour Mohammed in 764 and the Sultanate's accession to his cousin Ashraf Shaaban bin Hussein bin Nasser bin Qalawun. In 767, the Franks and the King of Cyprus took possession of Alexandria. The Crusades did not end with the expulsion of the Crusaders from Acre in 690 and their completion from all the Levant during the days of Ashraf Salah al-Din Khalil ibn al-Mansur Qalawun. They were expelled from the island of Arwad in 702 days. But the Crusades continued because many of the Crusaders had taken refuge in the island of Cyprus after being expelled from the Levant, and they took this island as a stable, and they raided the lands of the Muslims whenever they found the opportunity for them. The Luzganan family, which ruled the island at that time, Mission, mother has taken over This family and the rule of the island in 760 Peter I, has visited Western Europe, and called on the Pope and the kings of Europe to help him to wage a war against Muslims, got some support and walked with those who came from the Crusaders and occupied Alexandria.

In 778 Al-Ashraf Shaaban was killed and the Sultanate surrendered to his son Al-Mansur Ali. He remained in his command until he died in 783. He was succeeded by his brother Saleh Haji for one year and then took off. The order was taken by Sultan Al-Zaher Barqouq, the first of the Circassian Mamluks. Al-Mutawakil was ordered to go out to the city of Qus by the prince of Asakir Aybak al-Badri, who came to Zakaria ibn al-Khalifa, the believer, and gave him the office without any allegiance or unanimity. The Caliph traveled to Qus and returned to his home. Fifteen days later he returned to the office and removed Zakaria. The office was only fifteen days, on the twentieth of the first spring of 779 AH.

In 785 Sultan Barqouq captured the Al-Mutawakil I and imprisoned him in Qal'at al-Jabal, deposed him from the office, and he pledged allegiance to the Muhammad ibn al-Wathiq. He remained in the office for three years. Al-Mutawakil I did not accept it, but Zakariya asked for a trusted brother who sat on the throne for fifteen days without a sale of the year 779 AH, and he took the office and called the name of the Al-Mu'tasim. He remained in succession until 791 AH and returned to the office, removed Al-Musta'sim. Al-Mutawakil continued the office until 808 AH. In the month of Jumada al-Akhirah of the same year (791) Sultan Barqouq was arrested and imprisoned in Karak. Sultan Al-Salih Haji was returned to the Sultanate. He changed his title from Al-Salih to Al-Mansour, but remained in the Sultanate for eight months. Al-Mansur Haji took off in the month of Safar in 792 AH, and ended the reign of the Calawan family. The rule of the Mamluks passed and the Mamluks of Circassia.

References

Bibliography

14th-century births
1406 deaths
Cairo-era Abbasid caliphs
14th-century Abbasid caliphs
15th-century Abbasid caliphs
Sons of Abbasid caliphs